This is the list of Asian Winter Games records in speed skating, current after the 2017 Asian Winter Games.

Men

Women

References

External links
OCA

Records
Speed Skating
Speed skating-related lists